Sir Norman Fenwick Warren Fisher  (22 September 1879 – 25 September 1948) was a British civil servant.

Fisher was born in Croydon, London, the only son of Henry Warren Fisher. He was educated at the Dragon School (Oxford), Winchester College and Hertford College, Oxford. He matriculated in 1898, taking a first Classical Moderations in 1900 and a graduating with a second in Greats in 1902.

After failing to get into the Indian Civil Service and the medical examination for the Royal Navy, he came a lowly 15th in the Inland Revenue entrance exams in 1903. Sixteen years later he was Permanent Secretary to the Treasury and the first-ever Head of the Home Civil Service. Fisher has been described as one of the most influential British civil servants of his generation.

Fisher gave the Civil Service a cohesion it previously lacked and did more to reform it than any man in the preceding fifty years.  He increased the importance of the Treasury.  He advanced the interests of women in the civil service and at one point described himself as a feminist.   However, he was also a controversial figure: his colleague Maurice Hankey, with whom he sometimes co-operated and sometimes competed on issues of imperial defence policy, once described him as 'rather mad', and he was criticised for his attempts to control the appointments of senior civil servants across Whitehall. Christopher Bullock was one example. His generally unsuccessful attempts to gain a say in Foreign Office appointments were much resented, and gave rise to unfounded accusations that he had been an appeaser (despite a robust defence of his reputation by the anti-appeaser Robert Vansittart).

He married Mary Ann Lucie (Maysie) Thomas on 24 April 1906 and had two sons, but the marriage ended in separation in 1921. He died in London a few days after his 69th birthday.

Sir Noel Curtis-Bennett eulogised him in a letter to The Times: 

His elder son Norman Fisher (d. 1982) made his career in the Royal Navy, surviving two submarine disasters before the war and attaining the rank of captain; his second son Robin died in 1988.

Offices held

References

Bibliography
 Fisher, Sir (Norman Fenwick) Warren at Oxford Dictionary of National Biography (requires login)
 Hennessy, Peter, Never Again (London: Penguin Books 1992)
 O'Halpin, Eunan, Head of the Civil Service: A Study of Sir Warren Fisher, (London: Routledge 1989)
'Sir Warren Fisher, Head of the Civil Service 1919 - 1939', PhD thesis by Eunan O'Halpin

1879 births
1948 deaths
Permanent Secretaries of HM Treasury
Civil servants in the Board of Inland Revenue
People educated at The Dragon School
People educated at Winchester College
Alumni of Hertford College, Oxford
Knights Grand Cross of the Order of the Bath
Knights Grand Cross of the Royal Victorian Order